Pramod Sawant ministry may mean 
 First Pramod Sawant ministry
 Second Pramod Sawant ministry